William John Koman (September 16, 1934 – November 1, 2019) was a professional American football linebacker who played in the National Football League for the Baltimore Colts, Philadelphia Eagles, and the Chicago/St. Louis Cardinals.  He played college football at the University of North Carolina and was drafted in the eighth round of the 1956 NFL Draft.

Koman was a two-time Pro Bowl selection for the Cardinals in 1962 and 1964. He died in St. Louis in 2019.

References

1934 births
2019 deaths
People from Ambridge, Pennsylvania
Sportspeople from the Pittsburgh metropolitan area
Players of American football from Pennsylvania
American football linebackers
North Carolina Tar Heels football players
Baltimore Colts players
Philadelphia Eagles players
Chicago Cardinals players
St. Louis Cardinals (football) players
Eastern Conference Pro Bowl players